Heimonen is a Finnish surname. Notable people with the surname include:

 Juho Heimonen (1861–1930), Finnish farmer and politician
 Taavetti Heimonen (1870–1920), Finnish politician
 Marcus Heimonen (born 1993), Finnish footballer

Finnish-language surnames